The 5th constituency of the Sarthe is a French legislative constituency in the Sarthe département.

Historic representation

Election results

2022

 
 
 
 
 
 
 
 
|-
| colspan="8" bgcolor="#E9E9E9"|
|-
 
 

 
 
 
 
 

* PS dissident without the support of the NUPES alliance

2017

 
 
 
 
 
 
 
|-
| colspan="8" bgcolor="#E9E9E9"|
|-

2012

 
 
 
 
 
|-
| colspan="8" bgcolor="#E9E9E9"|
|-

2007

Sources and references
 Official results of French elections from 1998: 

5